Siah Bid-e Sofla (also Romanized as Sīāh Bīd-e Soflá; also known as Sīāh Bīd-e Pā’īn) is a village in Dorudfaraman Rural District, in the Central District of Kermanshah County, Kermanshah Province, Iran. At the 2006 census, its population was 911, in 206 families.

References 

Populated places in Kermanshah County